Dr. Hassell Brantley House is a historic home located at Spring Hope, Nash County, North Carolina.  It was built in 1912, and consists of a two-story, five bay, central block with two-story gable roofed wings.  A has a one-story rear kitchen wing with a hip roof. The front facade features full-height, Classical Revival pedimented portico, with Ionic order columns and a wrap-around porch.

It was listed on the National Register of Historic Places in 1986.  It is located in the Spring Hope Historic District.

References

Houses on the National Register of Historic Places in North Carolina
Neoclassical architecture in North Carolina
Houses completed in 1912
Houses in Nash County, North Carolina
National Register of Historic Places in Nash County, North Carolina
1912 establishments in North Carolina
Historic district contributing properties in North Carolina